A Woman Is the Judge is an American 1939 drama film directed by Nick Grinde and starring Frieda Inescort, Otto Kruger, Rochelle Hudson, Mayo Methot, Gordon Oliver, and Arthur Loft. The film tagline is Love bridges the gulf between a judge and an underworld girl. This is an early film exploring such themes as gender equality and female lawyers. The film is based on the play by Alexandre Bisson.

Plot
A famous female lawyer (Frieda Inescort) at the peak of her career has to resign in order to defend her estranged daughter (Mayo Methot), with whom she lost any contact some 20 years ago, against a murder charge. A prosecuting attorney (Otto Kruger) has a secret crush on the judge.

Cast

Frieda Inescort as	Mary Cabot
Otto Kruger as	Steven Graham
Rochelle Hudson as	Justine West
Mayo Methot as	Gertie
Gordon Oliver as Robert Langley
Arthur Loft as	Tim Ryan
Walter Fenner as Harper
John Dilson as	Ramsey
Ben Hewlett as	Wolf
Beryl Mercer as Mrs. Butler

References

External links

1939 films
1930s English-language films
American drama films
Columbia Pictures films
Films directed by Nick Grinde
1939 drama films
1930s American films
English-language drama films